Giovanni Marchese di Provera, or Johann Provera, born c. 1736 – died 5 July 1804, served in the Habsburg army in Italy during the French Revolutionary Wars. Provera played a significant role in three campaigns against General Napoleon Bonaparte during the Italian Campaign of 1796.

Military career
Since he was 60 years old in 1796, Provera was born around 1736. During the Seven Years' War he fought at the Battle of Kolin. On 18 June 1789 he was promoted to General-Major (Major General) in the Habsburg army. He fought in Italy during the campaigns of 1794 and 1795, and became a Feldmarschall-Leutnant (Lieutenant General) on 4 March 1796. He was a Knight of the Order of Malta and held the noble rank of Marchese.

During the Montenotte Campaign in the spring of 1796, Provera led a 4,000-man Austrian-Sardinian division in the 21,000-strong army of the Kingdom of Sardinia-Piedmont. The Sardinians were allied to a 32,000-man Habsburg army led by Johann Beaulieu. On 12 April at the Battle of Montenotte, Bonaparte's French army managed to drive a wedge between the two allied armies. Pushing west, the French forces encountered part of Provera's division on 13 April at the Battle of Millesimo and pushed it back. To cover the retreat, Provera and about 900 men occupied a ruined castle from which they repelled repeated French assaults. On the morning of 14 April, Provera and his men were compelled to surrender.

After being exchanged, Provera rejoined József Alvinczi's Habsburg army in the third attempt to relieve the Siege of Mantua. In bitter fighting at the Second Battle of Bassano on 6 November 1796, Provera's division lost 1,000 casualties but helped repel Bonaparte's attack. He brought up reinforcements in the Austrian victory at the Battle of Caldiero on 12 November. During the losing effort at the Battle of Arcole on 15 to 17 November, Provera defended the village of Belfiore di Porcile against the daily attacks of André Masséna's French division.

In the fourth attempt to relieve Mantua, Alvinczi led the main Austrian effort from the north, down the Adige River valley. While the French army focused its attention to the north, Provera's 9,000 men struck at Legnago and Adam Bajalics von Bajahaza's 6,200 Austrians attacked Verona. On 9 January Provera drove in the French outposts near Legnago. Over the next few days he scouted the Adige to find a place to cross. The elderly general "showed very little sense of urgency" and "simply could not make up his mind what to do. On the 11th, he decided to order a bridge to be built over the Adige, then countermanded it soon afterwards." On the night of 13 January he built a pontoon bridge over the river at Angiari, crossed the next morning, and headed for Mantua. He left a force behind to defend the bridge.

Meanwhile, Bonaparte had inflicted a crushing defeat on Alvinczi at the Battle of Rivoli. The French general ordered large forces to converge on and destroy Provera's column. Delayed by a French cavalry brigade, the Austrians arrived in front of Mantua on the 15th and 16th of January. Provera tried and failed to break through the fortified suburb of San Giorgio, held by the French. At dawn on the 16th, Dagobert von Wurmser's garrison tried to break out but was repulsed. Soon, Napoleon concentrated heavy forces behind the Austrians. Hemmed in by greatly superior numbers, Provera surrendered near La Favorita Palace with 6,000 men. Even the 2,000 men left to defend the pontoon bridge were captured.

Provera retired from military service on 29 April 1797. He died in Venice on 5 July 1804.

Notes

References
 Boycott-Brown, Martin. The Road to Rivoli. London: Cassell & Co., 2001. 
 Chandler, David. The Campaigns of Napoleon. New York: Macmillan, 1966.

 Smith, Digby. The Napoleonic Wars Data Book. London: Greenhill, 1998. 
 Smith, Digby and Kudrna, Leopold (compiler) napoleon-series.org Austrian Generals 1792-1815: Provera

Generals of former Italian states
Italian military personnel in Austrian armies
Italian people of the French Revolutionary Wars
18th-century Italian military personnel
Austrian Empire military leaders of the French Revolutionary Wars
Austrian military personnel of the Seven Years' War
1736 births
1804 deaths
Knights of Malta
Margraves of Italy